Great Limber is a village and civil parish in the West Lindsey district of Lincolnshire, England. The population of the civil parish at the 2011 census was 271.

In 1885 Kelly's Directory noted a Wesleyan chapel, built in 1841. Its population in 1881 was 489.

Great Limber Grade I listed Anglican church is dedicated to St Peter. It is built in Norman and Decorated styles, consisting of chancel, nave, and aisles, with attached chapels and south porch, and a low crenellated west tower with three bells. The church was partly restored in 1873. Its chancel is mostly Victorian, although its arch is 13th-century as is the font. An 1890 stained glass window in the north aisle is by Kempe.

Lincolnshire preceptories
Until their disbandment in 1312, the Knights Templar were major landowners on the higher lands of Lincolnshire, where they had a number of preceptories on property which provided income, while Temple Bruer was an estate on the Lincoln Heath, believed to have been used also for military training. The preceptories from which the Lincolnshire properties were managed were:
Aslackby Preceptory, Kesteven
Bottesford, Lindsey
Eagle, Kesteven
Great Limber, Lindsey
Horkstow, Lindsey
Witham Preceptory, Kesteven
Temple Bruer, Kesteven
Willoughton Preceptory, Lindsey
Byard's Leap was part of the Temple Bruer estate.

References

External links

"Great Limber", Genuki.org.uk. Retrieved 5 November 2011

Villages in Lincolnshire
Civil parishes in Lincolnshire
West Lindsey District